Anicius Acilius Glabrio Faustus ( 425–443) was an aristocrat of the later Roman Empire. He was Urban prefect three times before 437, consul in 438, and briefly Praetorian prefect of Italy in 442. Faustus was selected to promulgate the Theodosian Code in the Western Empire.

Faustus was the son of Acilius Glabrio Sibidius, who is known from a dedication to him from Faustus. Sibidius was a member of the lineage of the Acilii Glabriones, who descended from the consul of 191 BC, Manius Acilius Glabrio. Cameron states his mother was one of the house of the gens Anicia, although unable to identify the woman. His descendants include Rufius Achilius Maecius Placidus (cos. 481), Anicius Acilius Aginantius Faustus (cos. 483), and Rufius Achilius Sividius (cos. 488).

References 

5th-century Romans
5th-century Roman consuls
Acilii
Anicii
Imperial Roman consuls
Praetorian prefects of Italy
Urban prefects of Rome